Casitas Dam is an earthfill dam across Coyote Creek that forms Lake Casitas in Ventura County, California near Oak View, California. The dam is located two miles (3 km) above the junction of Coyote Creek and the Ventura River. Water from the Ventura River is diverted to Lake Casitas as well. The  structure was built by the U.S. Bureau of Reclamation. It is a key part of the Ventura River Project. Construction was completed in 1959 and was strengthened in June–December 2000 as a seismic improvement to help withstand earthquakes greater than 6.5. Lake Casitas has a  storage capacity and provides irrigation and municipal uses for the Casitas Municipal Water District.

See also
List of dams and reservoirs in California
List of largest reservoirs of California

References

External links 
 
 
Lake Casitas Recreation Area

Buildings and structures in Ventura County, California
Dams in California
United States Bureau of Reclamation dams
Dams completed in 1959